Butler Report may refer to:

 the report of the Butler Committee (1927) on the princely states of India
 the Education Act 1944, which introduced the Tripartite System of secondary education in England and Wales
 the Butler Review, a 2004 British government inquiry into the intelligence relating to Iraq's weapons of mass destruction